Katarína Kachlíková (born 2 June 1985) is a retired Slovak tennis player.

She took part in the 2006 Bangalore Open and qualified but lost in the first round to Isha Lakhani. She won three doubles titles and one singles title on the ITF Women's Circuit. She played on the WTA Tour and also took part in the 2009 Summer Universiade. Kachlíková retired from professional tennis 2011.

ITF Circuit finals

Singles (1–1)

Doubles (3–9)

References

External links
 
 

1985 births
Living people
Sportspeople from Žilina
Slovak female tennis players
Universiade medalists in tennis
Universiade bronze medalists for Slovakia
Medalists at the 2009 Summer Universiade
21st-century Slovak women